Pepper huasteco yellow vein virus (PHV) is a plant pathogenic virus of the family Geminiviridae.

References

External links
ICTVdB - The Universal Virus Database: Pepper Huasteco virus

Begomovirus
Viral plant pathogens and diseases